Support for Learning is a quarterly peer-reviewed academic journal published by Wiley-Blackwell on behalf of NASEN. The journal was established in 1986 and covers the field of special education as it relates to mainstream schools. Topics of note include the relationship between theory, research and practice, curriculum development and delivery, and classroom management.

External links 
 

Wiley-Blackwell academic journals
English-language journals
Publications established in 1986
Quarterly journals
Education journals